This is the first edition of the tournament.

Seeds

Draw

References

External links
 Main draw

Challenger Club Els Gorchs - Doubles